The Trade Unions Central Stadium is a multi-use stadium in Voronezh, Russia.  It is currently used mostly for football matches by Russian Premier League side Fakel Voronezh.  The stadium holds 31,793 people.

On November 17, 2010 the stadium was used for a friendly soccer match between the national soccer teams of Russia and Belgium, in which the Russian team lost against Belgium by 0–2. Both goals were scored by Romelu Lukaku (at that time it were his only goals for the national team).

References

Football venues in Russia
Sport in Voronezh
FC Fakel Voronezh
Buildings and structures in Voronezh Oblast